Narayanganj Osmani Stadium is a football stadium located about 600 meters away from Chashara Bus Stand in Narayanganj Sadar Upazila.

See also
Fatullah Osmani Stadium
Stadiums in Bangladesh
Sheikh Kamal International Stadium, Cox's Bazar
Sheikh Kamal International Stadium, Gopalganj

Football venues in Bangladesh
Organisations based in Narayanganj